The Augusta Tigers was the primary moniker of the minor league baseball teams in Augusta, Georgia. Beginning in 1884, Augusta has hosted numerous teams in various leagues.

History

The Augusta Yankees were a South Atlantic League minor league baseball team based in Augusta, Georgia that played from 1962 to 1963. The team was managed by Ernie White in 1962 and Rube Walker in 1963. It played its home games at Jennings Stadium. Notable players include Pete Mikkelsen, Dooley Womack and Roger Repoz.

The Augusta Tigers were a minor league baseball team that existed on-and-off from 1936 to 1958. Based in Augusta, Georgia, they played in the South Atlantic League from 1936 to 1942, from 1946 to 1952 and from 1955 to 1958. They were affiliated with the Detroit Tigers in 1936, from 1941 to 1942 and from 1955 to 1958. From 1937 to 1940 and from 1946 to 1949 they were affiliated with the New York Yankees. In 1950, they were affiliated with the Washington Senators. They played their home games at Jennings Stadium.

The Augusta Wolves were a South Atlantic League (1930) and Palmetto League (1931) minor league baseball team based in Augusta, Georgia. The team played its home games at Jennings Stadium. Multiple notable players spent time with the team, including Debs Garms and Wally Moses.

The Augusta Tygers were a minor league baseball team based in Augusta, Georgia, USA. They played in the South Atlantic League from 1922 to 1929. In 1926, under manager Johnny Nee, they were the league champions.

They were named after Ty Cobb, who began his professional career in Augusta in 1904.

They played their home games at Jennings Stadium.

The Augusta Georgians were a minor league baseball team that played from 1920 to 1921 in the South Atlantic League. Based in Augusta, Georgia, USA, they were managed by Dolly Stark in 1920 and by Emil Huhn in 1921. Under Stark, they went 55–68, and under Huhn they went 78–68.

Notable players include Troy Agnew, Bud Davis, Doc Knowlson, Curt Walker, Doc Bass, Don Songer, and Stark himself.

Year-by-year record

Notable alumni

Baseball Hall of Fame alumni
 Ty Cobb (1904-1905) Inducted, 1936

Notable alumni
 Pete Appleton (1950)
 Jim Bagby (1910) 1920 AL Wins Leader
 Eddie Cicotte (1905) Black Sox Scandal
 Clint Courtney (1948) 
 Jerry Denny (1983)
 Debs Garms (1930) 1940 NL Batting Title
 Fred Gladding (1958)
 George Harper (1936) 
 Don Heffner (1929)
 Ralph Houk (1941) Manager: 1960-1961 World Series Champion New York Yankees
 Matt Kilroy (1885) 1887 AA Wins leader. 
Jack Mealey (1937)
 Wally Moses (1931) 2 x MLB All-Star
 Joe Page (1941) 3 x MLB All-Star
 Mel Queen (1940) 
 Nap Rucker (1906)
 Gabby Street (1926) Manager: 1931 World Series Champion St. Louis Cardinals
 Bill Swift (1929)
 Bob Swift (1936)
 George Thomas (1958)
 John Tsitouris (1956) 
 Curt Walker (1919-1920)
 Rube Walker (1963)
 Hal Woodeshick (1957) 2 x MLB All-Star

References

External links
Baseball Reference

Baseball teams established in 1884
Sports clubs disestablished in 1963
South Atlantic League (1904–1963) teams
Southern League (1885–1899) teams
Defunct Georgia State League teams
Defunct Palmetto League teams
Detroit Tigers minor league affiliates
New York Yankees minor league affiliates
Washington Senators minor league affiliates
1884 establishments in Georgia (U.S. state)
1963 disestablishments in Georgia (U.S. state)
Sports in Augusta, Georgia
Defunct baseball teams in Georgia
Defunct South Atlantic League teams
Baseball teams disestablished in 1963